Jhalawar City railway station is a small railway station in Jhalawar, Rajasthan. Its code is JLWC. It serves Jhalawar city. The station consists of a single platform. The platform is not well sheltered. It lacks many facilities including water and sanitation.

Important trains 
 05613/05614 Jhalawar City–Kota Passenger Special
 59837/59837 Jhalawar City–Kota Passenger
 59839/59840 Jhalawar City–Kota Passenger
 22997/22998 Jhalawar City–Shri Ganganagar Superfast Express

References

Jhalawar
Railway stations in Jhalawar district
Kota railway division